The Vemaka were an ancient Indian tribe, located north of the larger tribe of the Kuninda in northern India.

They are known for their coins, as the silver coins of the Kunindas, the Vemakas and the Audumbaras closely follow the coins of the Indo-Greek king Apollodotus II in their characteristics (weight, size and material).

References

History of Uttarakhand
Bactrian and Indian Hellenistic period